Sergey Ivanovich Kuskov (June 6, 1957 in Moscow, USSR – June 22, 2008 in Krasnodar, Russia) was a renowned Russian curator.

Biography 
Kuskov was born on June 6, 1957, in Moscow to Ivan Kuskov (ru) and Irina, daughter of Russian scientist Alexander Chizhevsky. In 1980, he graduated from the Department of History at Moscow State University, with a major in History and Art Theory. In 1989 has defended his Ph.D. in Art Studies. After that he worked in Pushkin Museum of Fine Arts, Moscow and curated a large number of exhibitions.
He died on June 22, 2008, in Krasnodar.

References

External links
 National Center for Contemporary Arts: Sergey Kuskov Memorial evening
 Posthumous web site 
 Member list of Association of Art Critics 
 YOUR CIRCLE / Author Index 

1957 births
2008 deaths
Curators from Moscow
Moscow State University alumni